Andrew Ian McKay (born 14 July 1970) is a former Australian rules footballer who played for Carlton Football Club in the Australian Football League (AFL) and Glenelg Football Club in the South Australian National Football League (SANFL).

Playing career

McKay grew up in south eastern South Australia, and played junior football for Lucindale in the Kowree-Naracoorte Football League. Recruited by South Australian National Football League (SANFL) club Glenelg, McKay moved to Adelaide  in 1991 and played 40 games for Glenelg as a half-back flanker, finishing second in the Magarey Medal in 1992 behind Port Adelaide's Nathan Buckley.

Carlton
McKay was recruited by Carlton Football Club with its first round selection in the 1992 AFL Draft (No. 13 overall), although he was later fined $10,000 when it emerged that he had contacted four of the AFL's struggling clubs (and ) and warned them that he would stay in South Australia if one of those clubs drafted him – which contravened the AFL's draft tampering rules. He nevertheless remained eligible to play for Carlton, and he made his debut in Round 1, 1993, immediately displaying the outstanding defensive skills that he had displayed at Glenelg. In his first AFL season, McKay was named on the half-back flank in the All-Australian team. He also represented South Australia at State of Origin that season, a feat he repeated in 1994 and 1995. In 1995, McKay was a member of Carlton's premiership team, the only premiership in his senior career.
McKay played 15 of Carlton's 24 matches in the 1996 AFL season.

Continuing with Carlton, McKay played two more matches for South Australia, and was the winner of the Fos Williams Medal before the end of top-level State of Origin football in 1999. He made the All-Australian team as half-back flanker three times consecutively in 1999, 2000 and 2001, bringing his career tally to four. In 2003, McKay's final season, he assumed the Carlton captaincy following the mid-season retirement of Brett Ratten, and also won Carlton's Best and Fairest award for the only time in his career and McKay announced his retirement from his playing career at the end of the 2003 season.

McKay played a total of 244 games and kicked a total of 28 goals for Carlton Football Club from 1993 until 2003. He was also member of Carlton's 1995 premiership team.

McKay is a life member and Hall of Fame Inductee of the Carlton Football Club.
In 2007, he was inducted into the South Australian Football Hall of Fame.

Sports administration career

After retiring from his playing career, McKay joined the newly formed Match Review Panel, set up in 2005 as an overhaul of the AFL Tribunal system; from 2007 until 2009, he served as Chairman of that panel. He has also been involved in the Laws of the Game Committee. 

In October 2011, McKay was appointed to the position as Head of Football at the Carlton Football Club, when he replaced the outgoing Steven Icke. In August 2018, McKay stepped down from his position as Head of Football at the Carlton Football Club. He was replaced by Brad Lloyd.

Personal life

While still playing in 1996, McKay began a degree in veterinary science, studying at the University of Queensland. To balance his study with his football career, McKay trained with the University of Queensland Australian Football Club whilst commuting to Melbourne on most weekends to play matches with Carlton.

Since retiring from his playing career, McKay has practised as a veterinarian. He has three children, all of whom have played football in some capacity. In October 2018, Andrew's daughter Abbie was selected with Pick 16 in the 2018 AFL Women's Draft and in doing so made history being the first ever Father-Daughter selection in the Australian Rules Football history.

Statistics

|-
|- style="background-color: #EAEAEA"
! scope="row" style="text-align:center" | 1993
|style="text-align:center;"|
| 5 || 23 || 7 || 7 || 223 || 148 || 371 || 72 || 34 || 0.3 || 0.3 || 9.7 || 6.4 || 16.1 || 3.1 || 1.5 || 2
|-
! scope="row" style="text-align:center" | 1994
|style="text-align:center;"|
| 5 || 23 || 4 || 5 || 199 || 174 || 373 || 69 || 50 || 0.2 || 0.2 || 8.6 || 7.6 || 16.2 || 3.0 || 2.2 || 3
|- style="background-color: #EAEAEA"
|style="text-align:center;background:#afe6ba;"|1995†
|style="text-align:center;"|
| 5 || 25 || 1 || 2 || 238 || 163 || 401 || 90 || 31 || 0.0 || 0.1 || 9.5 || 6.5 || 16.0 || 3.6 || 1.2 || 4
|-
! scope="row" style="text-align:center" | 1996
|style="text-align:center;"|
| 5 || 15 || 4 || 3 || 97 || 89 || 186 || 36 || 26 || 0.3 || 0.2 || 6.5 || 5.9 || 12.4 || 2.4 || 1.7 || 0
|- style="background-color: #EAEAEA"
! scope="row" style="text-align:center" | 1997
|style="text-align:center;"|
| 5 || 22 || 2 || 3 || 191 || 159 || 350 || 80 || 34 || 0.1 || 0.1 || 8.7 || 7.2 || 15.9 || 3.6 || 1.5 || 2
|-
! scope="row" style="text-align:center" | 1998
|style="text-align:center;"|
| 5 || 20 || 3 || 2 || 172 || 164 || 336 || 59 || 27 || 0.2 || 0.1 || 8.6 || 8.2 || 16.8 || 3.0 || 1.4 || 2
|- style="background-color: #EAEAEA"
! scope="row" style="text-align:center" | 1999
|style="text-align:center;"|
| 5 || 26 || 2 || 2 || 269 || 157 || 426 || 95 || 46 || 0.1 || 0.1 || 10.3 || 6.0 || 16.4 || 3.7 || 1.8 || 9
|-
! scope="row" style="text-align:center" | 2000
|style="text-align:center;"|
| 5 || 25 || 3 || 7 || 271 || 206 || 477 || 121 || 51 || 0.1 || 0.3 || 10.8 || 8.2 || 19.1 || 4.8 || 2.0 || 8
|- style="background-color: #EAEAEA"
! scope="row" style="text-align:center" | 2001
|style="text-align:center;"|
| 5 || 24 || 2 || 3 || 247 || 176 || 423 || 124 || 33 || 0.1 || 0.1 || 10.3 || 7.3 || 17.6 || 5.2 || 1.4 || 9
|-
! scope="row" style="text-align:center" | 2002
|style="text-align:center;"|
| 5 || 19 || 0 || 3 || 171 || 114 || 285 || 77 || 51 || 0.0 || 0.2 || 9.0 || 6.0 || 15.0 || 4.1 || 2.7 || 2
|- style="background-color: #EAEAEA"
! scope="row" style="text-align:center" | 2003
|style="text-align:center;"|
| 5 || 22 || 0 || 3 || 189 || 125 || 314 || 66 || 40 || 0.0 || 0.1 || 8.6 || 5.7 || 14.3 || 3.0 || 1.8 || 4
|- class="sortbottom"
! colspan=3| Career
! 244
! 28
! 40
! 2267
! 1675
! 3942
! 889
! 423
! 0.1
! 0.2
! 9.3
! 6.9
! 16.2
! 3.6
! 1.7
! 45
|}

References

External links
Andrew McKay at the Carlton Football Club website 

All-Australians (AFL)
Australian veterinarians
Male veterinarians
1970 births
Living people
Carlton Football Club players
Carlton Football Club Premiership players
South Australian State of Origin players
Glenelg Football Club players
John Nicholls Medal winners
Australian rules footballers from South Australia
South Australian Football Hall of Fame inductees
People from Lucindale, South Australia
Australia international rules football team players
One-time VFL/AFL Premiership players